The following is a list of episodes of the television series Connor Undercover.

Series 1: 2010

Series 2: 2010

External links 
 

Connor Undercover